The commune of Mabayi is a commune of Cibitoke Province in north-western Burundi. The capital lies at Mabayi.

References

Communes of Burundi
Cibitoke Province